Drop rate may refer to:
Drop rate (video gaming), the chance of obtaining a random item
Packet drop rate, the rate at which packets are lost in a network connection